Karaoke Star Jr. is a reality television show for children that airs on YTV and CMT. This show is just like the show Karaoke Star, except it features kids instead of adults. It is hosted by Paul McGuire (CMT) and Phil Guerrero (YTV). The purpose of the show is to discover Canada's first ever Karaoke Star Jr. The show premiered on YTV and CMT on March 16, 2009 at 7pm ET. New episodes of the show now air every Monday on these stations. Jamiee is the winner from the first season.

Gameplay

The show travelled to eight Canadian cities: Vancouver, Edmonton, Saskatoon, Winnipeg, Toronto, Ottawa, Halifax, and St. John's. There, young singers between the age of 6 and 15 could audition. In each one, five singers (seven in Toronto) were selected to sing in front of the judges. Then the public voted by SMS for their favourite singer from each city. These eight singers will be competing in the show's finale.

Singers could also audition online by uploading a video of them singing. The public also voted for their favourite cyberstar. The one who got the most votes will be joining the eight singers in the finale. The judges also got to choose their favourite cyberstar; he/she will also be competing in the finale.

These ten singers will travel to Calgary, where they will sing in the Performance Showdown on May 18. The public will then vote for their favourite one. After that, in the Finale on the next day, the announced winner (determined by who got the most votes)  will win the grand prize of $5000.

Judges
The show has two permanent judges that go to every city where the show goes. These judges are: R&B singer Danny Fernandes, and Canadian Idol finalist Tara Oram. There is also an additional guest judge in every city.
These are the guest judges:

Vancouver: Josh Ramsay

Edmonton: Kreesha Turner

Saskatoon: Josh Palmer

Winnipeg: Rusty Matyas

Toronto: Nathan Ferraro

Ottawa: Luke Doucet

Halifax: Rebekah Higgs

St. John's:  Rex Goudie

Cities
Karaoke Star Junior travelled to these cities where singers could audition:

Vancouver
This was the first city which the show visited.

Finalist - Viewer Voted: Geena from Burnaby, British Columbia

Other singers who performed in front of the judges:

Emily from Maple Ridge, British Columbia
Sammi from Maple Ridge, British Columbia
Nicole from Maple Ridge, British Columbia
DianaLyn from Vancouver, British Columbia
Serefina from Abbotsford, British Columbia	
Jenna from Langley, British Columbia
Arden from Surrey, British Columbia

Edmonton

This was the second city that the show visited.

Finalist - Viewer Voted: Mieke from Edmonton, Alberta.

Other contestants who performed in front of the judges:

Daylin from St. Albert, Alberta
Chris Meredith from Airdrie, Alberta
Prestina from Edmonton, Alberta
Kristen from Edmonton, Alberta
Andrea from Edmonton, Alberta

Saskatoon

This is the third city that the show visited.

Finalist - Viewer Voted: Tenille from Weyburn, Saskatchewan.

Other contestants who performed in front of the judges:

Michelle from Saskatoon, SK

Wynter from Medicine Hat, AB

Grace from Moose Jaw, SK

Alexandra from Saskatoon, SK

Winnipeg
This is the fourth city the show visited.

Finalist- Viewer Voted: Andrea from Winnipeg, Manitoba

Other Contestants who performed in front of the judges were:

1.Emily from Dryden, ON

2.April Rose from Winnipeg, MB

3.Moises from Winnipeg, MB

4.Samantha from Winnipeg, MB

Toronto

This is the fourth city that the show visited.

Finalist - Viewer Voted: Natalie from Sudbury, Ontario

Other contestants who performed in front of the judges:

1.Destiny from Wasaga Beach, ON

2.Stephanie from London, ON

3.Adam Gauthier from Windsor, ON

4.Atileo from Brampton, ON

5.Cassiddy from Ancaster, ON

6.Philon from Mississauga, ON

Ottawa

This is the fifth city that the show visited.

Finalist - Viewer Voted: RJ

Other contestants who performed in front of the judges:

Halifax

This is the sixth city that the show visited.

Finalist - Viewer Voted: Brianna

Other contestants who performed in front of the judges:

Jordin from New Germany, NS
Noemie from New Brunswick
Lindsay from Halifax, NS
Corey from Yarmouth, NS

St. John's

This is the last city that the show visited.

Finalist - Viewer Voted: Jamiee from L'Anse-au-Clair, Newfoundland and Labrador

Other contestants who performed in front of the judges:

Damian from Main Brook, NL
Kayla  from Marystown, NL
Alexandria from Portugal Cove, NL
Amber  from Botwood, NL

References

External links
 Official Site

2000s Canadian children's television series
2000s Canadian reality television series
2000s Canadian music television series
Canadian children's musical television series
Canadian children's reality television series
CMT (American TV channel) original programming
YTV (Canadian TV channel) original programming
Television series about children
Television series about teenagers
Television series by Corus Entertainment